Aerides falcata is a species of epiphytic orchid native to Yunnan, Vietnam, Thailand, Laos, Cambodia, Myanmar.

References 

falcata
Plants described in 1851
Epiphytic orchids
Flora of Indo-China
Orchids of Thailand
Orchids of Vietnam
Orchids of Yunnan